The Huai'an–Xuzhou Expressway, commonly referred to as the Huaixu Expressway is an expressway that connects the cities of Huai'an, Jiangsu, China, and Xuzhou, Jiangsu. The expressway is a spur of G25 Changchun–Shenzhen Expressway and is entirely in Jiangsu Province.

It passes through the following cities, all of which are in Jiangsu Province:
 Huai'an
 Suqian
 Xuzhou

References

Chinese national-level expressways
Expressways in Jiangsu